Empire of the Blind is the fourth studio album by American thrash metal band Heathen, released on September 18, 2020. It is the band's first album in 11 years, following The Evolution of Chaos (2009), the first to feature Jason Mirza and Jim DeMaria on bass and drums respectively, and their first release on Nuclear Blast.

Background 
Although recording had not officially commenced until 2019, Heathen began working on the follow-up to The Evolution of Chaos in 2012 after they signed to Nuclear Blast. For the remaining seven years, the band was sidetracked by lineup changes, individual projects, and guitarist Kragen Lum filling in for Gary Holt in Exodus whenever Holt was touring with Slayer. In a September 2020 interview with KMUW radio, Lum recalled: "By about 2014 I had half the record completely demoed with vocals and everything. I continued to write over the next few years but I more or less too busy to demo it and properly finish the songs. I was touring with Exodus pretty heavily from about 2015 until 2019. Whenever we had a long enough break, I would work on stuff but it just really wasn't until last year where I had enough time to finish writing and I had more than enough for an album. There's a song that we actually didn't even record."

Reception 
Empire of the Blind was released to positive reviews from critics. Paul Hutchings of The Razor's Edge described the album as "top drawer with plenty of detail and thought applied", and stated, "The production of the album is slick and sharp, with engineering, production, mixing and mastering by Christopher 'Zeuss' Harris with additional work by Lum. Of course, without the music this is all irrelevant. Thankfully, Empire of the Blind meats all the expectations and more. Superbly performed, this is an album that should feature highly in the top albums of the year."

Track listing

Personnel

Heathen 
 David White – lead vocals
 Lee Altus – guitars
 Kragen Lum – guitars, backing vocals
 Jason Mirza – bass
 Jim DeMaria – drums

Additional musicians 
 Gary Holt – guitar solo 
 Rick Hunolt – guitar solo 
 Doug Piercy – guitar solo 
 Zeuss – backing vocals

Production and design 
 Zeuss – production, recording , engineering, mixing, mastering
 Kragen Lum – recording , art direction, layout
 Juan Urteaga – recording 
 Doug Piercy – recording 
 Travis Smith – artwork
 Alvin Petty – logo
 Chrissie Dieu – photography

Charts

References 

Heathen (band) albums
2020 albums